Samuel Alexander Bill MBE (10 December 1864 – 24 January 1942) was an Irish Christian missionary, explorer and the founder of the Qua Iboe Mission (later renamed Mission Africa).
Bill was raised in Ballymacarrett Presbyterian Church, east Belfast, but was most notably associated with Island Street Belfast City Mission Hall. His interest in missionary work was sparked by a visit to Belfast by Dwight L. Moody and Ira D. Sankey in 1874. He attended the Harley Missionary Training College in London, then under the leadership of Henry Grattan Guinness; and travelled to Nigeria to commence a work amongst the Ibeno people in 1887. The mission base was founded on the banks of the Qua Iboe River, and this base gave the name to the independent interdenominational mission that Bill founded.

Bill was a contemporary of Mary Slessor. Although not as well known as his Scottish counterpart, Bill's legacy is twofold. First, many historians of the Irish evangelical missionary movement note that he was one of the most influential men of his time, inspiring many in Ireland to overseas Christian service. The Qua Iboe Mission grew to be one of the largest and most successful missions in the UK. Secondly, the church that he founded, the Qua Iboe Church has grown to considerable proportions, numbering at least 2 million strong in 2007, and his memory is still strongly revered by many Nigerian Christians today. A theological college at Abak in southern Nigeria is named in his honour.

References and Related Studies 
 Gerald H Anderson, ed., Biographical Dictionary of Christian Missions (Simon and Schuster Macmillan, NY,1998).
 JS Corbett, "According to Plan" (Belfast: QIF, 1986)
 RJ Graham The Qua Iboe Mission 1887 - 1945 (PhD Thesis, University of Aberdeen)
 E.B. Ikpe, Qua Iboe Church of Nigeria: the first hundred years: the next jubilee (Uyo: QIC, 1987).
 Robert L. MacKeown, Twenty-five years in Qua Iboe: the story of a missionary effort in Nigeria (London: Marshall Morgan and Scott, 1912).

External links
 United Evangelical Church/QIC Utako Abuja National Worship Centre
Facebook of United Evangelical Church/QIC Utako
 The Qua Iboe Church
 Mission Africa

Presbyterian missionaries in Nigeria
Irish Presbyterian missionaries
1864 births
1942 deaths
British expatriates in Nigeria
British Presbyterian missionaries
Clergy from Belfast
People from colonial Nigeria